Bofors 120 mm Naval Automatic Gun L/50 (full English name: Bofors 120 mm Automatic Gun L/50 In Naval Twin Turret), also known as Bofors 120 mm gun model 1950 and the like, was a Swedish twin-barreled  caliber fully automatic dual purpose naval gun turret system designed by Bofors from the end of the 1940s to the early 1950s to meet a request from the Dutch Navy. Besides the Dutch Navy, the weapon was also adopted by the Swedish and the Colombian Navy.

Use in the Dutch Navy 
The Dutch were the initial users of the Bofors 120 mm Naval Automatic Gun L/50. As part of rebuilding the Dutch Navy post WWII, the Dutch Navy had requested several naval gun systems to be developed by Bofors for their next generation of naval-vessels, one being a twin-barreled 120 mm dual-purpose gun for the planned Holland-class destroyers. This request led to the creation of the Bofors 120 mm Naval Automatic Gun L/50.

The gun entered active service with the Dutch Navy in 1954 mounted on the Holland-class destroyers. Even before the first Holland-class destroyer had been completed the Dutch Navy decided to order yet another class of destroyer armed with the Bofors 120 mm L/50, the Friesland-class destroyer. The Dutch really liked the design and decided in the mid 1970s to save two turrets from the Holland-class destroyer HNLMS Gelderland (D811) when she was decommissioned in 1973, and then fit them to the new Tromp-class frigates under construction.

Use in the Swedish Navy 

Following the Dutch example, the Swedish Navy decided to acquire the new 120 mm system being developed for them and fit it to a new generation of destroyers in 1950. In Swedish service the weapon was fitted to the Halland-class destroyers HSwMS Halland (J18) and HSwMS Småland (J19), both of which entered service in 1956. The weapon was initially designated 12 cm automatkanon m/50 (12 cm akan m/50),  "12 cm autocannon m/50", but around 1970 the weapon was redesignated to 12 cm torndubbelautomatpjäs m/50 (12 cm tdblapjäs m/50),  "12 cm turret double automatic piece m/50".

The gun was in use until the Halland-class destroyers were taken out of service.

Use in the Colombian Navy 

Unlike the Swedish Halland-class destroyers, the Colombian version carried three Bofors 120 mm Naval Automatic Gun L/50 turrets instead of two.

See also 
Bofors 57 mm Naval Automatic Gun L/60
Bofors 120 mm Automatic Gun L/46

References

Notes

Bibliography 
Borgenstam Insulander Kaudern; "Jagare". Karlskona 1989. CB Marinlitteratur. 
12 cm luftvärnsautomatkanon m/50 tekniskt beskrivning fastställd 1951. (12 cm anti air autocannon m/50 technical description established 1951) booklet.

Bofors
Naval guns of the Netherlands
Naval guns of Sweden
Artillery of Sweden
120 mm artillery
Military equipment introduced in the 1950s